Mary Kay Place (born September 23, 1947) is an American actress, singer, director, and screenwriter. She is known for portraying Loretta Haggers on the television series Mary Hartman, Mary Hartman, a role that won her the 1977 Primetime Emmy Award for Outstanding Supporting Actress - Comedy Series. Her numerous film appearances include Private Benjamin (1980), The Big Chill (1983), Captain Ron (1992) and Francis Ford Coppola's 1997 drama The Rainmaker. Place also recorded three studio albums for Columbia Records, one in the Haggers persona, which included the Top Ten country music hit "Baby Boy." For her performance in Diane (2018), Place won the Los Angeles Film Critics Association Award for Best Actress and the National Society of Film Critics Award for Best Actress.

Early life 
Place was born in Tulsa, Oklahoma, the daughter of Gwendolyn Lucille (née Johnson) and Bradley Eugene Place. She graduated from Nathan Hale High School and the University of Tulsa, where her father was an art professor; she was a member of Kappa Alpha Theta sorority and received a speech degree.

Career
Place moved to Hollywood with aspirations of becoming an actress and writer. She was hired for The Tim Conway Comedy Hour in the 1970s as a production assistant to both Conway and producer Norman Lear. Conway gave her her first on-camera break, while Lear saw to it that Place received her first writing credit on his subsequent All in the Family. On the episode, she and actress Patty Weaver sang "If Communism Comes Knocking on Your Door, Don't Answer It." She appeared in the third-season episode of M*A*S*H titled "Springtime", for which she also received writing credits.

Mary Hartman, Mary Hartman and musical career
Lear then cast her in the role of would-be country and western star Loretta Haggers on the satirical soap opera Mary Hartman, Mary Hartman (1976–1977). She won an Emmy Award for her work as Loretta, and was nominated in 1977 for a Grammy Award for Best Country Vocal Performance, Female for the associated music album Tonite! At the Capri Lounge Loretta Haggers. Place wrote two of the songs on Tonite!: "Vitamin L" and "Baby Boy," both of which she sang on the television series as Loretta.

Both Tonite! At the Capri Lounge Loretta Haggers and its follow up Aimin' To Please featured A-list country and pop performers from the 1970s. Dolly Parton, on whom the Loretta character was loosely based, provided backing vocals as well as the song "All I Can Do" (which Parton also wrote). Emmylou Harris, Anne Murray and Nicolette Larson sang backup as well. Aimin' to Please'''s "Something to Brag About," a duet with Willie Nelson, earned the pair a place on the music charts in 1977.

While working on Mary Hartman, Mary Hartman, Place also wrote scripts for episodes of several TV situation comedies, including The Mary Tyler Moore Show, Phyllis and M*A*S*H, usually in collaboration with Linda Bloodworth-Thomason (who would later create Designing Women). She appeared in the M*A*S*H episode "Springtime," which she co-wrote with Bloodworth. She also made an appearance in the sitcom All in the Family in the episode "Archie Goes Too Far" as Betty Sue.

Place hosted Saturday Night Live in 1977 and was one of the few hosts who also appeared as the musical guest (with Willie Nelson on the duet "Something to Brag About").

Late 1970s through 1990s

In the 1977 musical drama New York, New York, directed by Martin Scorsese, Place sings "Blue Moon" with Robert De Niro, whose character also accompanies her on saxophone. It is included in the original motion picture soundtrack.

In the 1979 Burt Reynolds romantic comedy, Starting Over, Place plays the first woman Reynolds dates after a divorce.

In 1983, Place had a key role in the Lawrence Kasdan ensemble piece The Big Chill as Meg, a single corporate attorney who wishes to be impregnated with her first child by one of her past college friends.

In the late 1980s and early 1990s, the actress appeared in a number of television movies and a starring role in the 1992 Kurt Russell and Martin Short comedy Captain Ron. 1994 saw her return to television in the recurring role of Camille Cherski on My So-Called Life. In 1996, Place comically portrayed an evangelistic anti-abortion activist in Alexander Payne's debut feature film Citizen Ruth. She had a strong dramatic role as Dot Black, mother of a terminally ill young man, in Francis Ford Coppola's version of John Grisham's The Rainmaker in 1997.

Place was nominated for an Independent Spirit Award for her work in the 1996 film Manny & Lo with Scarlett Johansson and Aleksa Palladino. She plays the matronly Elaine, who would love to have a child and works in a maternity shop, but never married and is past her child-bearing years.

She directed episodes of the HBO sitcom Dream On, NBC's Friends and the series Baby Boom. She provided at least two voices for Fox's animated show King of the Hill in an episode in which Peggy Hill competes in the Mrs. Heimlich County Pageant. She voiced both a competitor and the coordinator of the pageant.

Place appeared in Being John Malkovich as the hard-of-hearing receptionist, Floris, and in Girl, Interrupted. While not in any scenes together, this marked the third time that Mary Kay had done a film with one of her former My So-Called Life co-stars: first with Claire Danes in The Rainmaker, second with Bess Armstrong in Pecker, then with Jared Leto in Interrupted.

 2000–2019 
In 2000, the actress co-directed Don Henley's video for "Taking You Home". She had a small role in her second Lisa Krueger movie, Committed.

She played the United States Surgeon General in a 2001 episode of NBC's The West Wing. The character returned in the 2004 season.

In the original PBS mini-series Armistead Maupin's Tales of the City, Place had a self-referential moment as a Maupin character during the Mary Hartman era in which the series is set. Laura Linney's character often watched Mary Hartman, Mary Hartman. Showtime picked up the Tales franchise, but Place was not in the second installment. She did have a role in the third mini-series, Further Tales of the City (2001), which featured her in the role of "Prue Giroux."

In 2002, Place had a sizable role in the Reese Witherspoon movie Sweet Home Alabama as Witherspoon's character's mother, Pearl Smooter. That same year she was in Human Nature starring Tim Robbins and Patricia Arquette and A Woman's a Helluva Thing with Penelope Ann Miller as well as with Albert Brooks in the dark comedy My First Mister. The story focuses on a developing relationship between an isolated, rebellious 18-year-old (Leelee Sobieski) and an engaging older man (Brooks). Place played Brooks' best friend. The film marked the directorial debut of actress Christine Lahti.

Place played a Mormon mother in the film Latter Days (2003). From 2006 to 2011, she had a recurring role in HBO's Big Love, playing Adaleen Grant, the mother of the Chloë Sevigny character, Nicki. She also had a recurring role on the HBO comedy Bored to Death. Lily Tomlin and Place did the pilot and 5 episodes of 12 Miles of Bad Road from Harry Thomason and Linda Bloodworth-Thomason, who wrote television scripts with Place in the 1970s. HBO chose not to air the series, and producers were seeking other networks to air it.

In 2009, she served as the voice of Julie Powell's mother in the film Julie & Julia. In 2013, she appeared as Bryan's mother on The New Normal.

In 2015, Place guest starred on The Mentalist and Looking. She also starred in the comedy-drama film I'll See You in My Dreams directed by Brett Haley, opposite Blythe Danner, and The Breakup Girl directed by Stacy Sherman. She provided the voice of Anne Hathaway's mother in The Intern, directed by Nancy Meyers. Place also had a recurring role on Grace and Frankie opposite Jane Fonda and Lily Tomlin.

In 2016, Place starred in the comedy film The Hollars directed by John Krasinski and the comedy-drama Youth in Oregon directed by Joel David Moore. Place also portrayed Maria Bamford's mother in the comedy series Lady Dynamite which was cancelled after two seasons.

In 2017, Place guest starred in an episode of the comedy series Black-ish. She also had a cameo voice appearance in Downsizing directed by Alexander Payne. Place also had a recurring role on the comedy series Imposters.

In 2018, Place starred in State Like Sleep directed by Meredith Danluck and appeared in an episode of the anthology drama The Romanoffs. That same year, she starred in the drama film Diane directed by Kent Jones, and executive produced by Martin Scorsese. The film marked Place's first lead role in a film, and was written specifically for her by Jones. The film had its world premiere at the Tribeca Film Festival on April 22, 2018. Place's performance received rave reviews from critics. The film was released on March 29, 2019, by IFC Films. Place won the Los Angeles Film Critics Association Award for Best Actress and National Society of Film Critics Award for Best Actress for her performance. Place received nominations for Gotham Independent Film Award for Best Actress and Independent Spirit Award for Best Female Lead. Place also had a recurring role on Shameless.

 2020–present 
In 2020, Place guest starred on the comedy-drama series AJ and the Queen, and on Fox's 9-1-1: Lone Star as the mother to Liv Tyler's character. In 2021, Place played Millie in the musical drama Music, co-written and directed by Sia. She also starred in the musical The Prom'' based on the Broadway musical of the same title directed by Ryan Murphy, for Netflix.

Filmography

Film

Television

As director or writer

Discography

Albums

Note: Both of Place's albums just missed charting on the general pop Billboard Hot 200 chart, her 1976 bubbled under in the ten runnerup slots at #202 and the 1977 at #203.

Singles

References

External links
 
 

1947 births
Living people
American women country singers
American country singer-songwriters
American film actresses
American soap opera actresses
American television actresses
American television directors
American television writers
American voice actresses
American women television directors
American women television writers
Actresses from Tulsa, Oklahoma
University of Tulsa alumni
20th-century American actresses
21st-century American actresses
American women screenwriters
Columbia Records artists
Outstanding Performance by a Supporting Actress in a Comedy Series Primetime Emmy Award winners
Singer-songwriters from Oklahoma
Writers from Tulsa, Oklahoma
Musicians from Tulsa, Oklahoma
Screenwriters from Oklahoma
Country musicians from Oklahoma